Víctor Suárez Carrera (born 16 September 1952) is a Mexican politician. He is Undersecretary of Food and Competitiveness of the Secretariat of Agriculture and Rural Development of the Government of Mexico since December 1, 2018. He is an agronomist specializing in agricultural economics from the Universidad Autónoma Chapingo. He has diplomas in Senior Management of Public Entities (INAP) and public policies for the agri-food sector (INAP-Colegio de Postgraduados). His greatest learning has been obtained alongside the struggles of the Chinantec, Zapotec and Mixe communities of Oaxaca and Tojolabales of Chiapas, as well as the peasant organizations of the National Association of Marketing Companies of Rural Producers (ANEC), of which He was CEO from 1995 to 2017.

As a federal deputy in the LIX Legislature (2003-2006), he was part of the Commissions of Agriculture and Livestock, of Economy and of Budget and Public Account; chaired the Committee of the Center for Studies for Sustainable Rural Development and Food Sovereignty (Cederssa), and promoted the Law of Planning for Sovereignty and Food and Nutritional Security, the Law of Protection and Improvement of Mexican Seeds and the initiative for the creation of from Cederssa, among others.

His vast experience of more than 40 years as a peasant organizer, public administrator, legislator and forger of social movements places him as a renowned specialist in public policies for the agri-food sector and rural development of the country.

He has published the books: Does Peasant Agriculture Have a Future? Public policies for food sovereignty and rural development with peasants (2005); Public policies for Mexican agriculture based on consensus and certainty. The case of the Law of Planning for Food and Nutrition Sovereignty and Security (2011), and Rescue of the Mexican countryside. Peasant organization and post-neoliberal public policies. (2017). The latter compiles a series of articles and essays that he published between 2000 and 2016 in various magazines and journalistic supplements, especially La Jornada del Campo.

Among the recognitions he has received, highlights his integration to the Board of the Institute for Agriculture and Trade Policy, Minneapolis, Minnesota, USA (2009-2011), and his designations as Innovator at the Service of Society, by the Ashoka Foundation (1997- 1999); Social Entrepreneur by the Schwab Foundation (2002), and Distinguished Agronomist by the National Association of Alumni of Chapingo (2015).

As Undersecretary of Food and Competitiveness of the Ministry of Agriculture, he actively participates in the Intersectoral Group of Health, Food, Environment and Competitiveness (GISAMAC), which integrates officials and institutions of the Government of Mexico and organizations of the social sector, and whose work is to work for a fair, healthy, sustainable and competitive agri-food and nutritional system.

References

1952 births
Living people
Politicians from Mexico City
Members of the Chamber of Deputies (Mexico)
21st-century Mexican politicians
Deputies of the LIX Legislature of Mexico